Bogna is a female given name of Polish origin. It may be a diminutive form of various names, including Bogdana, Bogusława, and Bogumiła. The name is derived from the word "bog" and may mean "divine" but also "luck, fate, rich".

People
 Bogna Bartosz, Polish classical singer
 Bogna Burska (born 1974), Polish playwright and visual artist
 Bogna Jóźwiak (born 1983), Polish sabre fencer
 Bogna Koreng (born 1964), Sorbian journalist
 Bogna Krasnodębska-Gardowska (1900–1986), Polish painter
 Hanna Bogna Margońska (born 1968), Polish botanist
 Bogna Sobiech (born 1990), Polish handball player

See also
 
 Slavic names

External links

 http://www.behindthename.com/name/bogna

Polish feminine given names
Slavic feminine given names